Utiku railway station was a station on the North Island Main Trunk in New Zealand, and in the Manawatū-Whanganui region. It opened in 1904 and closed in 1986. It was part of the  Mangaweka to Taihape section, officially opened by the Prime Minister, Richard Seddon, on 21 November 1904. It closed in 1986. A passing loop remains.

The name Utiku had a biblical origin as a transliteration of Eutychus.

History 

The station was planned in 1902, when work on the  line had reached Utiku. Tenders were put out in August 1903, track had been laid as far as Toi Toi Viaduct by February 1904  and the  extension from Mangaweka to Utiku opened for goods traffic on Friday, 27 May 1904. though worked by the Public Works Department. Goods were worked through to Taihape from 4 August 1904. On Saturday, 10 September 1904 Utiku opened for passengers as a flag station, with a shelter shed and platform. Three days later a contract was let to Russell & Bignell of Whanganui for £1203.5s to build the station, which was ready by 21 February 1905. It had a cart approach, loading bank, cattle and sheep yards, fixed signals and a passing loop for 50 wagons, which was extended to 100 wagons in 1970 and 126 by 1980. Due to growing business, the station was enlarged and a stationmaster appointed in 1907. A telephone was added in 1909.

Utiku was important enough to have annual returns of its traffic recorded, as did Taihape to the north and Hunterville to the south. For example, it had 6,599 passengers in 1923, but was 4th largest on NIMT in terms of sheep and pig inwards traffic and still had a substantial timber trade, both inwards and outwards.

On 31 January 1982 the station closed to all but in Ravensdown fertiliser in wagon lots and to that on 31 October 1986.

In 2017 a bank to the south of the station was strengthened with shotcrete and soil nails.

Toi Toi Viaduct 
Toi Toi Viaduct lies about south of Utiku. The contract for the steelwork went to Scott Bros of Christchurch. Work on the viaduct was under the cooperative system. It was completed in February 1904 and tested in September 1904. It is one of the few dating from that era, though it was strengthened in 1934. The Mangaweka deviation of 1981 starts just south of the viaduct.

Timber 
When the railway opened the area was still extensively forested. Like other stations along this part of NIMT, this station had freight from several timber mills.

On 11 May 1904, before the line opened, Albert Gibbs applied for a siding at Utiku. A cable of the tramway suspension bridge, which led to their mill, broke in 1912, resulting in the mill being shut until a new bridge, mill and tramway opened in 1914, the plans having been drawn in 1913. Similar collapses occurred in 1904 and 1920, though no one was killed then. The 1914 bridge was replaced in 1961. Only the northern tower of the 1914 bridge remains. In 1922 the Gibbs Bros butter box factory was blown down. It finally burnt down in 1927.

Perham & Larsen also had a mill north of the station, until they moved to Rangataua in 1909, and they and Manawatu Timber Co both had sidings in 1906. As the bush was depleted, mills closed. In 1909 there were 9 mills, but in 1911 only two.

Incidents 
In 1910 a landslip in a cutting near Utiku derailed a goods train. A freight train derailed in 2006 on the crossing loop, due to stiff couplings.

References

External links 

 1908 photo of tramway bridge and village
 Photo of express train passing Utiku in 1911
 Photo of freight train on Toi Toi Viaduct in 2020

Defunct railway stations in New Zealand
Buildings and structures in Manawatū-Whanganui
Rail transport in Manawatū-Whanganui
Railway stations opened in 1904
Railway stations closed in 1986